Georg Katzer (10 January 1935 – 7 May 2019) was a German composer and teacher. The last master student of Hanns Eisler, he composed music in many genres, including works for the stage. Katzer was one of the pioneers of electronic new music in the German Democratic Republic and the founder of the first electronic-music studio in the GDR. He held leading positions in music organisations, first in the East (Akademie der Künste der DDR), then in the united Germany (Academy of Arts, Berlin, and Deutscher Musikrat), and received many awards, including the Art Prize of the German Democratic Republic, the National Prize of the German Democratic Republic, the Order of Merit of the Federal Republic of Germany, and the German Music Authors' Prize.

Biography 
Katzer was born in Habelschwerdt, Lower Silesia (now Bystrzyca Kłodzka, Poland), on 10 January 1935. From 1954 to 1960 he studied piano, music theory, and composition with (amongst others) Rudolf Wagner-Régeny and Ruth Zechlin at the Hanns Eisler Hochschule für Musik in East Berlin, then from 1957 to 1958 he studied in Prague with Karel Janáček. From 1961 to 1963 he was a postgraduate student of Hanns Eisler and Leo Spies at the German Academy of the Arts in Berlin, the last master student of Eisler. In 1963, he became a freelance composer and musician.

From 1976 to 1977 he worked in electronic-music studios in Bratislava and Paris. In 1978 Katzer was elected to membership in the Academy of the Arts in East Berlin. In 1980 he was appointed a professor and subsequently taught a masterclass in composition at the Academy of the Arts until 1991.  In 1986 he founded the Studio for Experimental Music, affiliated with the Music Department of the Academy of the Arts, and was its artistic director.

Katzer was a member of the Academy of Arts in East Berlin until 1993, and then a member of the Berlin section of music until his death. He served as vice president of the music section from 1994 to 2003. From 1989 to 1991, he was president of the German Section of the C.I.M.E. (International Council for Electroacoustical Music). From 1990 to 2001, he was a presiding member of the Deutscher Musikrat (German Music Council, a member of the International Music Council).

Katzer lived in Zeuthen near Berlin until his death on 7 May 2019; he was 84 years old.

Compositions 
Katzer's earlier works owe a great deal to the music of Béla Bartók, Igor Stravinsky, and his teacher, Hanns Eisler. In the late 1960s he came under the influence of Witold Lutosławski and Bernd Alois Zimmermann, departing from conventional tonality and forms. From this point on, his vocabulary included serial, aleatory, and collage techniques, as well as electronic sounds. His compositions included works for chamber ensembles, orchestral works, solo concertos, operas, ballets, puppet plays, and oratorios. His work also encompassed electroacoustical pieces, music for radio dramas, multimedia projects, and projects involving improvised music. His compositions are held by the Saxon State and University Library Dresden, including:
 String Quartet No. 1 (1965)
  (1972)
 Die Igeltreppe for narrator and 13 instruments, text by Sarah Kirsch (1973)
 Das Land Bum-Bum, opera (1973)
  (Music machine in D major), for orchestra (1973)
 Schwarze Vögel, ballet (1975)
 Szene für Kammerensemble, instrumental theatre (1975)
 Bevor Ariadne kommt, for electronic sounds (1976)
 Concerto for Harpsichord and Wind Quintet (1978)
 Ein neuer Sommernachtstraum, ballet (1979)
 Aide-memoire, for electronic sounds (1983)
 Gastmahl oder über die Liebe, opera, libretto by Gerhard Müller (1987)
 Antigone oder die Stadt, opera, libretto by Gerhard Müller (1989)
 Mein 1989, radio composition (1990)
 Ich bin ein anderer, Hörspiel after Arthur Rimbaud (1990)
 L'homme machine, multimedia scenic action (2000)
 Medea in Korinth, oratorical scenes, libretto by Christa Wolf (after ). Premiered on 6 September 2002 at the Konzerthaus Berlin
 Fukujamas Kiste, for electronic sounds (2002)

Awards 

 1976: Art Prize of the German Democratic Republic
 1981: National Prize of the German Democratic Republic for complete compositions
 1987:  for music from the Free German Trade Union Federation
 1992: 
 1992: Honorary guest of the Villa Massimo
 1998: 
 2003: Officer's Cross of the Order of Merit of the Federal Republic of Germany
 2011: Preis der deutschen Schallplattenkritik
 2012 German Music Authors' Prize in the category Composition Experimental music

References

Cited sources

Further reading 
 Amzoll, Stefan. 1978. "Die Stimmen der toten Dichter. Eine Radio-Komposition von Georg Katzer". Musik und Gesellschaft 28, no. 12 (December): 720–21.
 Amzoll, Stefan. 1993. "Georg Katzers 'Multimedia'-Projekte: Eine Dokumentation". Positionen: Beiträge zur Neuen Musik, no. 14: 26–29.
 Becker, Peter. 2005. "'...aus heiterem Geiste geschöpfet': Der Komponist Georg Katzer". Neue Zeitschrift für Musik 166, no. 4 (July–August): 56–57.
 Belkius, Gerd. 1982a. "Bemühungen um neuen Wirkungsraum für Musik. Der Komponist Georg Katzer". Weimarer Beiträge 28 (April): 42–55.
 Belkius, Gerd. 1982b. "Interview mit Georg Katzer". Weimarer Beiträge 28 (April): 30–41.
 Dümling, Albrecht. 2005. "In der Musik müssen wir ganz ehrlich sein: Georg Katzer im Gespräch über seinen Lehrer Hanns Eisler". Eisler-Mitteilungen: Internationale Hanns-Eisler-Gesellschaft 12, no. 37:21–24.
 Förstel, François. 1998. "'Sprechen als Musik genommen': Experimentelle Schülerarbeiten mit Schwitters, Aperghis und Katzer". Musik & Bildung: Praxis Musikunterricht 30, no. 3 (May–June): 22–27.
 Herz, Joachim. 1994. "Der lustige Musikant oder Das Land Bum Bum: Kinderoper von Rainer Kirsch und Georg Katzer". In Die lustige Person auf der Bühne, 2 vols., edited by Peter Csobádi, 2: 721–731. Anif-Salzburg: Mueller-Speiser. 
 Kämpfer, Frank. 1999. "Frühmorgens, beim Sturz der Regierung: Georg Katzer im Gespäch". Neue Zeitschrift für Musik 160, no. 6 (November–December): 22–25.
 Noeske, Nina. 2005. "'Auch eine Musik ist Maschine': NIna Noeske über Georg Katzers D-Dur-Musikmaschine (1973)". Musikforum: Referate und Information des Deutschen Musikrates 3, no. 1:27–29.
 Noeske, Nina. 2008a. "Die D-Dur-Musikmaschine". In Musikalische Dekonstruktion: neue Instrumentalmusik in der DDR, third edition, 286–296. Cologne: Böhlau. .
 Noeske, Nina. 2008b. "IV.2.2.3.3 Katzer: Baukasten für Orchester". In Musikalische Dekonstruktion: neue Instrumentalmusik in der DDR, third edition, 302–305. Cologne: Böhlau. .
 Raab Hansen, Jutta. 1992. "Georg Katzer". Komponisten der Gegenwart, Loseblatt-Lexikon, edited by Hanns-Werner Heister and Walter-Wolfgang Sparrer. Munich: Edition text + kritik. 
 Rebling, Eberhard. 1981. "Ein neuer Sommernachtstraum: Ballett von Georg Katzer". Musik und Gesellschaft 31, no. 7:423–24.
 Schneider, Frank. 1984. "Und das Schöne blüht nur im Gesang: Zwei Versuche uber Georg Katzers Komposition". MusikTexte: Zeitschrift für Neue Musik, no. 7:25–29.
 Vieth, Heike. 1997. "Georg Katzers Szene: Für Kammerensemble". In Jeder nach seiner Fasson: Musikalische Neuansätze heute, edited by Claudia Schurz and Ulrike Liedtke, 219–24. Saarbrücken: Pfau-Verlag. 
 Ziegenrücker, Kai-Erik. 1987. "Studios für elektronische Musik in Berlin und Dresden". Bulletin des Musikrates der DDR 24, no. 2:31–35.

External links 

 
 
 
 Georg Katzer articles (in German) related to Katzer in Musik der Zeit

1935 births
2019 deaths
20th-century classical composers
21st-century classical composers
German classical composers
Hochschule für Musik Hanns Eisler Berlin alumni
Officers Crosses of the Order of Merit of the Federal Republic of Germany
Members of the Academy of Arts, Berlin
People from Bystrzyca Kłodzka
People from the Province of Silesia
German male classical composers
20th-century German composers
21st-century German composers
20th-century German male musicians
21st-century German male musicians